Nine is a 2013 South Korean television series starring Lee Jin-wook and Jo Yoon-hee. It aired on tvN from March 11 to May 14, 2013 on Mondays and Tuesdays at 23:00 (KST) time slot for 20 episodes.

According to a news article released by Deadline Hollywood on October 25, 2013, an American remake of this series was put into development by ABC; however, it was never produced.

Concept
The science fiction / romance series is about a man who finds nine magical incense sticks that allow him to travel 20 years back in time. He attempts to keep his family safe in order to change the world he lives in today. However, this is not without consequences as his actions in the past affects the lives of many in the present, including his.

As the show has a unique way of dealing with the concept of time travel, its ending is open to interpretation.

Synopsis

Nine tells the story of a man who finds nine incense items which allows him to travel 20 years back in time.

Cast
2012/2013
 Lee Jin-wook as Park Sun-woo
 A news anchor at a TV broadcast station. A tragedy happens to his family, so he gets the chance to travel back in time to avenge them, and at the same time recover his love. But he has a limited number of trips to the past, to try and pinpoint the right moment to go back and change.
 Jo Yoon-hee as Joo Min-young
 A junior reporter, and Sun-woo's colleague.
 Jeon No-min as Park Jung-woo 
 Sun-woo's older brother, who holds the key to solving a mystery — a crime that Sun-woo is trying to solve as he bounces back and forth in time.
 Kim Hee-ryung as Son Myung-hee (65)
 Jin Ye-sol as young Myung-hee 45 years ago
 Sun-woo and Jung-woo's mother.
 Jung Dong-hwan as Choi Jin-chul (67)
 Seo Dong-won as young Jin-chul 45 years ago
 Chairman of stem cell research company.
 Lee Eung-kyung as Kim Yoo-jin
 Um Hyo-sup as Oh Chul-min (52)
 CBM station president.
 Lee Seung-joon as Han Young-hoon 
 A neurosurgeon, and Sun-woo's best friend.
 Yeon Je-wook as Kim Beom-seok
 Oh Min-suk as Kang Seo-joon
 A surgical resident, and Min-young's boyfriend.
 Greena Park as Lee Joo-hee
 Yoo Se-rye as Sung Eun-joo
 Lee Jun-hyeok as Sang-beom
 CBM News team leader.
 Lee Shi-woo as Young-soo
 Kim Won-hae as Park Chang-min (64)
 Lee Han-wi as Joo Sung-hoon
 Min-young's stepfather.
 Park Won-sang as (cameo)

1992/1993
 Park Hyung-sik as Park Sun-woo
 Jo Min-ah as Joo Min-young
 Seo Woo-jin as Park Jung-woo
 Park Moon-ah as Sung Eun-joo
 Kim Hee-ryung as Son Myung-hee (45)
 Jeon Guk-hwan as Park Chun-soo
 Jung Dong-hwan as Choi Jin-chul (47)
 Um Hyo-sup as Oh Chul-min (32)
 Lee Yi-kyung as Han Young-hoon
 A model student.
 Na Hae-ryung as Han So-ra
 Ga Deuk-hee as Kim Yoo-jin
 Kim Won-hae as Park Chang-min (44)

Awards and nominations

International broadcast

References

External links
  
 
 

2013 South Korean television series debuts
2013 South Korean television series endings
TVN (South Korean TV channel) television dramas
Korean-language television shows
South Korean time travel television series
South Korean science fiction television series
Television series set in 1992
Television series set in 1993
Television series set in 2012
Television series set in 2013
Television series about journalism
South Korean fantasy television series
South Korean mystery television series
Television series by Chorokbaem Media
Television series by JS Pictures
Television shows written by Song Jae-jung